Helen Pearson (born 16 November 1959) is a British actress who has been in three major soap operas, EastEnders (during 1990 as April McIntosh), Emmerdale (from 2000 to 2001 as Carol Wareing), and as Frankie Osborne in Hollyoaks from 2002 until 2017.

Career
Her first acting role was in 1987, playing a Nurse in The Growing Pains of Adrian Mole. She also played April in EastEnders in the early 1990s 

She has also appeared in the television dramas The Darling Buds of May and Murder in Mind.

Before making her Hollyoaks debut, she also played the character Mrs. Atkins in Attachments.

On Halloween 2017, after having been the longest-serving female on Hollyoaks as Frankie Osborne for 15 years, the character was killed off and Pearson left the show.

Personal life 
Pearson married in 2013. In 2015, she was convicted for drink driving. She is the older sister of Richard Cadell, the incumbent puppeteer for Sooty.

Filmography

References

External links
 

British soap opera actresses
British television actresses
Living people
English soap opera actresses
1959 births